Scarsdale is a small town in rural Victoria, Australia, and approximately 25 km south west of Ballarat. It is situated in the north-western part of Golden Plains Shire, on the bank of the Woady Yaloak River and is primarily an agricultural community.
Scarsdale township includes a few community facilities including a primary school, a kindergarten, a general store, Town Hall, Post Office, the Scarsdale Community Park and The Scarsdale Hotel.
The township is built along the Glenelg Highway, and the highway is the main route to Ballarat (the closet major city).

The Scarsdale-Newtown Avenue Of Honour was established to commemorate WW1. The Avenue is located Glenelg Hwy Scarsdale, in Victoria Australia.

At the 2016 census, Scarsdale and the surrounding area had a population of 744.

References

Towns in Victoria (Australia)
Golden Plains Shire